Marc Tokich (born 12 May 1999) is an Australian professional footballer who plays as a defensive midfielder for NK BSK Bijelo Brdo.

International goals

Ausralia U23

References

External links

1999 births
Living people
Australian soccer players
Association football midfielders
Western Sydney Wanderers FC players
Mjällby AIF players
NK BSK Bijelo Brdo players
National Premier Leagues players
A-League Men players
Australian expatriate soccer players
Expatriate footballers in Sweden
Australian expatriate sportspeople in Sweden